Jahangir Hussain Mir is an Indian politician from the Indian National Congress, in the state of Jammu and Kashmir. He was the Deputy Chairman of Jammu and Kashmir Legislative Council from 2015 to 2017. He won a by-election in the Poonch Haveli Assembly constituency of Jammu and Kashmir Legislative Assembly in 2007.

He is currently serving as the President of Jammu and Kashmir Congress Minority Department.

References

Living people
Year of birth missing (living people)
20th-century Indian politicians
Indian National Congress politicians from Jammu and Kashmir
People from Poonch district, India